ktrace is a utility included with certain versions of BSD Unix and Mac OS X that traces kernel interaction with a program and dumps it to disk for the purposes of debugging and analysis.  Traced kernel operations include system calls, namei translations, signal processing, and I/O.

Trace files generated by ktrace (named  by default) can be viewed in human-readable form by using the kdump utility.

Since Mac OS X Leopard, ktrace has been replaced by DTrace.

See also 
 DTrace, Sun Microsystems's trace version, now running on OpenSolaris, FreeBSD, macOS, and Windows
 kdump (Linux), Linux kernel's crash dump mechanism, which internally uses kexec
 SystemTap
 trace on Linux, part of the Linux Trace Toolkit

References 

Unix programming tools